Sea-King (translation of the Old Norse term Sǣkonungr),  refers to a Viking, pirate chieftain of the early Middle Ages.

Sea King may also refer to:

Aviation
Sikorsky CH-124 Sea King, a Canadian version of the SH-3
Sikorsky SH-3 Sea King, an American naval helicopter
Westland Sea King, a British licensed version of the SH-3
Supermarine Sea King, a 1920s British flying-boat fighter aircraft

Fiction
 Sea King (comics), a villainous counterpart of DC Comics' Aquaman, who exists on Earth-Three
 Seaking (Pokémon), an orange and white, fishlike, water-type Pokémon
 Sea King (One Piece), a "One Piece" animal

Other uses
 Poseidon, the god of the sea in Greek mythology
 Sea King, the original name of CSS Shenandoah
 "The Sea King", a song by Hawkwind from their 1985 album The Chronicle of the Black Sword